Lars Staffan Jacobson, born 9 June 1948, is a Swedish art historian and author.  During the latter part of the 1960s he became politically active. According to Jacobson he first became active in the Third World movement, then the Peace movement and since then for libertarian socialism. In 1990 he published a book on graffiti art, Spraykonst and the same year he won the Swedish-American Foundation's (Sverige-Amerikastiftelsens) research scholarship in the USA. In 1996 his doctoral thesis Den spraymålade bilden (The Spray-painted Picture) was released. During the 2000s he published books on different subjects, some autobiographical.

Selected bibliography 

 Spraykonst - graffiti från tecken till bild. Åhus: Kalejdoskop. Libris 7676163.  (1990)
 Den spraymålade bilden. Graffitimåleriet som bildform, konströrelse och läroprocess. Lund: Aerosol Art Archives. Libris 8362600.  (1996)
 Dialog om frihet. Roman om den heta sommaren i Lund 1968. Malmö: Radikal distribution. Libris 8365115.  (2001)
 Anarkismens återkomst. Lund: India Däck Bokcafé. Libris 10152775.  (2006)
 Staffan Jacobson: Målningar/Paintings 1978-2018. India Däck Bokcafé Förlag, Lund 2018.

See also

 Lund's Anarchist Group (Founders) 
 Anarchism in Sweden (Lund's Anarchist Group)

References

Swedish art historians
1948 births
Living people

Swedish anarchists